Alligator Juniper may refer to:

A common name of Juniperus deppeana
Alligator Juniper (magazine), undergraduate literature and arts magazine published annually by Prescott College